The Calgary Rad'z were a professional inline hockey team that played two seasons in the Roller Hockey International in 1993 and 1994.  The Rad'z were a founding member of the RHI.  The Rad'z began play in the Olympic Saddledome, but moved to the much smaller Max Bell Arena midway through their first year.  The team folded following the 1994 season.

Season-by-season record
Note: GP = Games played, W = Wins, L = Losses, OTL = Overtime losses, Pts = Points, GF = Goals for, GA = Goals against

Notable players
Three former National Hockey League players played for the Rad'z in 1993:
Doug Dadswell
Morris Lukowich
Bob Wilkie

References

1993 Calgary Rad'z at hockeydb.com

 
Roller Hockey International teams
Rad
Sports clubs established in 1993
Sports clubs disestablished in 1994